Masayo (written: 雅世 or 雅代, 政代, 正世 or 匡代) is a feminine Japanese given name. Notable people with the name include:

, Japanese swimmer
, Japanese voice actress
, Japanese synchronized swimmer and coach
, Japanese entomologist
, Japanese voice actress
, Japanese diver
, Japanese physician, ophthalmologist and stem cell researcher
, Japanese politician

See also
5295 Masayo, a main-belt asteroid

Japanese feminine given names